Senator Schultz may refer to:

Dale Schultz (born 1953), Wisconsin State Senate
Debbie Wasserman Schultz (born 1966), Florida State Senate
Herman C. Schultz (1860–1935), Wisconsin State Senate, who in 1920 legally changed his name to Senator Schultz
Jason Schultz (born 1972), Iowa State Senate